Satoshi Watanabe may refer to:

Satosi Watanabe, theoretical physicist
Satoshi Watanabe (beach volleyball) (born 1975), Japanese beach volleyball player